Centroina is a genus of Australian white tailed spiders that was first described by Norman I. Platnick in 2000.

Species
 it contains eleven species:
Centroina blundells (Platnick, 2000) – Australian Capital Territory
Centroina bondi (Platnick, 2000) – Australian Capital Territory, Victoria
Centroina dorrigo (Platnick, 2000) – Australia (New South Wales)
Centroina enfield (Platnick, 2000) – Australia (New South Wales)
Centroina keira (Platnick, 2000) (type) – Australia (New South Wales)
Centroina kota (Platnick, 2000) – Australia (New South Wales)
Centroina lewis (Platnick, 2000) – Australia (Queensland)
Centroina macedon (Platnick, 2000) – Australia (New South Wales, Victoria)
Centroina sawpit (Platnick, 2000) – Australia (New South Wales, Victoria)
Centroina sherbrook (Platnick, 2000) – Australia (Victoria)
Centroina whian (Platnick, 2000) – Australia (New South Wales)

See also
 List of Lamponidae species

References

Araneomorphae genera
Lamponidae
Spiders of Australia